The Denver Falcons were the first professional ice hockey team in Colorado.  They were a member of the United States Hockey League.  Playing their home games at the University of Denver Ice Arena, the team had a memorable season in Denver, starting with winning Colorado's first professional hockey game over the St. Paul Saints 3-1 at DU. After a season which endured the tragic car crash death of Johnny Holota which also injured Billy Warwick, the Falcons advanced to the playoffs.  They were defeated by the favored Omaha Knights three games to two, ending the Falcons' only season.

The Falcons were coached by Bill Cook, and managed by Lyle Wright.

Team record

Players

NHL alumni

 Harold Brown - RW with New York Rangers (1946)
 Bob Chrystal - D with New York Rangers (1953–55)
 Joe Crozier - D with Toronto Maple Leafs (1959); Coach with Buffalo Sabres (1972–74) and Toronto Maple Leafs (1981)
 Lloyd "Red" Doran - C with Detroit Red Wings (1946–47)
 Johnny Holota - C with Detroit Red Wings (1943, 1946)
 Jack Jackson - D with Chicago Black Hawks (1946–47)
 Winston "Bing" Juckes - LW with New York Rangers (1947–48; 1949–50)
 Neil Strain - LW with New York Rangers (1952–53)
 Bill Warwick - LW with New York Rangers (1942, 1944)

References

1950 establishments in Colorado
1951 disestablishments in Colorado
Ice hockey clubs established in 1950
Ice hockey teams in Colorado
Sports clubs disestablished in 1951
Sports teams in Denver
Defunct sports teams in Colorado